The London Midland and Scottish Railway (LMS) Stanier Class 5 2-6-0 or Stanier Mogul is a class of 2-6-0 mixed traffic steam locomotives. Forty were built between October 1933 and March 1934.

Overview 
Although all built at Crewe Works, they were designed at Horwich Works and were developed from the Horwich Mogul, the LMS Hughes Crab 2-6-0. They had the addition of several features brought over from the Great Western Railway by newly arrived Chief Mechanical Engineer William Stanier, most notably the taper boiler (Stanier would have been familiar with the GWR 4300 Class). In an effort to please Stanier, Horwich had designed a GWR style top-feed cover and locomotive 13245 appeared with the feature fitted. Stanier was not at all pleased, ordering it promptly removed and replaced with the normal LMS cover.

Due to a higher boiler pressure than the Crabs the cylinders were 3" smaller in diameter and so the cylinders were able to be mounted horizontally: the only Stanier design to do so. Like the Crabs they were connected to a Fowler tender that was narrower than the locomotive. When built the first ten locomotives had no water pick-up gear fitted to their tenders.

They were initially numbered 13245–13284 (following on from the Crabs), but as standard locomotives, in the LMS 1933 renumbering scheme they were renumbered 2945–2984 in 1934 (the Crabs becoming 2700–2944). BR added 40000 to their numbers so they became 42945–42984. They were always painted black, and this was lined out except during the austere periods of the 1940s and towards the end of steam.

From the end of 1934 Stanier turned to a larger 4-6-0 for his mixed traffic class, this being the LMS Black Five Class.

Details

Withdrawal
Withdrawals commenced in November 1963 with the last one being withdrawn in February 1967.

Preservation 

One, 13268/(4)2968, the penultimate member of the class to be withdrawn, has been preserved. This locomotive was restored on the Severn Valley Railway and is, as of 2017, undergoing overhaul after withdrawal from service in January 2013. On two occasions, firstly between late 1994 and early 1998, and then between May 2010 and March 2012, it ran with the tender from Black 5 no. 45110, while its own Fowler-pattern one was undergoing repairs.

Models 
Bachmann Branchline has produced a model of the Stanier Mogul including the preserved example.        

Initial releases from Bachmann Branchline include the LMS Black Lined version 31-690 in February 2017, BR Black early emblem and BR Black late emblem. Later liveries to follow.

References

Bibliography

External links 

 Stanier Mogul Fund

5 Stanier Mogul
2-6-0 locomotives
Railway locomotives introduced in 1933
Standard gauge steam locomotives of Great Britain